This is a list of episodes of the 1972 Japanese animated television series . The episodes originally aired from December 3, 1972, to September 1, 1974, on Fuji Television.

Episodes

Mazinger Z
Mazinger